David Rhys-Jones (born 16 June 1962) is a former Australian rules footballer who played for the Carlton Football Club and the Sydney Swans in the Australian Football League (AFL). 

Rhys-Jones's reputation as a footballer is somewhat sullied by his regular visits to the AFL Tribunal; he currently holds the record for being the most reported player in VFL/AFL history, having had his number taken by umpires 25 times over his 13-season career. But when fit and available, Rhys-Jones's versatility, pace and agility made him a valuable footballer; the best example being when he was given the challenging task of playing in defence on  champion Dermott Brereton in the 1987 VFL Grand Final and held him goalless for the only time that season, resulting in Carlton winning its 15th VFL premiership and Rhys-Jones being awarded the Norm Smith Medal.

Career 
Rhys-Jones began his career with South Melbourne in 1980, which relocated north becoming the Sydney Swans in 1982. He moved back south to join Carlton in 1985 after a pay dispute. He remained with Carlton until his retirement in 1992. Rhys-Jones was a superbly balanced footballer, capable of playing in multiple positions and equally adept as a goalkicking option as he was at shutting down opponents. His nullifying of Dermott Brereton in the 1987 Grand Final earned Rhys-Jones the Norm Smith Medal. He was awarded nine Brownlow Medal votes that year.

In 1992, Rhys-Jones was appointed captain-coach of the North Launceston Football Club. After playing his 50th game in the 1995 winning grand final team, Rhys-Jones left to coach Frankston in the Victorian Football Association. After three years of successive finals appearances, including two grand finals, Rhys-Jones quit Frankston to concentrate on media commitments.

In 2000, he was appointed coach of Heidelberg Football Club. After a run of injuries in 2001, he decided to pull on the boots himself. The tribunal ruling that he was not allowed on the field forced Rhys-Jones to give his quarter-time team addresses from behind the boundary line. The following year, he announced in his biography that he used cocaine during his playing career.

Statistics

|- style=background:#EAEAEA
| scope=row | 1980 ||  || 40
| 4 || 3 || 4 || 30 || 14 || 44 || 10 ||  || 0.8 || 1.0 || 7.5 || 3.5 || 11.0 || 2.5 ||  || 0
|-
| scope=row | 1981 ||  || 30
| 18 || 1 || 5 || 175 || 108 || 283 || 56 ||  || 0.1 || 0.3 || 9.7 || 6.0 || 15.7 || 3.1 ||  || 3
|- style=background:#EAEAEA
| scope=row | 1982 ||  || 30
| 21 || 3 || 11 || 186 || 168 || 354 || 59 ||  || 0.1 || 0.5 || 8.9 || 8.0 || 16.9 || 2.8 ||  || 1
|-
| scope=row | 1983 ||  || 30
| 14 || 9 || 6 || 154 || 115 || 269 || 58 ||  || 0.6 || 0.4 || 11.0 || 8.2 || 19.2 || 4.1 ||  || 0
|- style=background:#EAEAEA
| scope=row | 1984 ||  || 30
| 19 || 23 || 13 || 178 || 127 || 305 || 64 ||  || 1.2 || 0.7 || 9.4 || 6.7 || 16.0 || 3.4 ||  || 0
|-
| scope=row | 1985 ||  || 26
| 19 || 22 || 13 || 156 || 153 || 309 || 59 ||  || 1.2 || 0.7 || 8.2 || 8.0 || 16.3 || 3.1 ||  || 2
|- style=background:#EAEAEA
| scope=row | 1986 ||  || 26
| 17 || 4 || 3 || 166 || 134 || 300 || 70 ||  || 0.2 || 0.2 || 9.8 || 7.9 || 17.6 || 4.1 ||  || 3
|-
| scope=row bgcolor=F0E68C | 1987# ||  || 26
| 20 || 7 || 4 || 172 || 166 || 338 || 64 || 21 || 0.4 || 0.2 || 8.6 || 8.3 || 16.9 || 3.2 || 1.1 || 9
|- style=background:#EAEAEA
| scope=row | 1988 ||  || 26
| 19 || 17 || 7 || 150 || 111 || 261 || 69 || 33 || 0.9 || 0.4 || 7.9 || 5.8 || 13.7 || 3.6 || 1.7 || 3
|-
| scope=row | 1989 ||  || 26
| 16 || 2 || 3 || 129 || 143 || 272 || 69 || 27 || 0.1 || 0.2 || 8.1 || 8.9 || 17.0 || 4.3 || 1.7 || 0
|- style=background:#EAEAEA
| scope=row | 1990 ||  || 26
| 8 || 15 || 6 || 52 || 46 || 98 || 26 || 7 || 1.9 || 0.8 || 6.5 || 5.8 || 12.3 || 3.3 || 0.9 || 0
|-
| scope=row | 1991 ||  || 26
| 1 || 1 || 1 || 3 || 2 || 5 || 1 || 0 || 1.0 || 1.0 || 3.0 || 2.0 || 5.0 || 1.0 || 0.0 || 0
|- style=background:#EAEAEA
| scope=row | 1992 ||  || 26
| 6 || 5 || 2 || 27 || 23 || 50 || 8 || 8 || 0.8 || 0.3 || 4.5 || 3.8 || 8.3 || 1.3 || 1.3 || 0
|- class=sortbottom
! colspan=3 | Career
! 182 !! 112 !! 78 !! 1578 !! 1310 !! 2888 !! 613 !! 96 !! 0.6 !! 0.4 !! 8.7 !! 7.2 !! 15.9 !! 3.4 !! 1.4 !! 21
|}

Honours and achievements
Team
 VFL premiership player: 1987
 McClelland Trophy: 1987

Individual
 Norm Smith Medal: 1987

Personal life 
Rhys-Jones married his second wife Cheri Donnelly in Queensland in 2001. They have a son together, Cooper, who has Prader-Willi Syndrome, and a daughter, Madison. Additionally, Rhys-Jones has three children from his first marriage: Sharna, Molly, and Dakota. Rhys-Jones and wife Cheri took over the Canada Hotel on Melbourne's Swanston Street, in 2002, renaming it the Plough and Harrow Hotel. That year, Rhys-Jones joined a reality show on Channel 7, called The Club, and he was chosen by audience votes to coach a new Australian rules football team in the Western Region Football League. The team was named the Kensington Hill Hammerheads, which Rhys-Jones coached to a premiership in its first (and only) year. Rhys-Jones lives in Melbourne.

References

Bibliography

External Links

Living people
Australian rules footballers from Victoria (Australia)
Carlton Football Club players
Carlton Football Club Premiership players
Sydney Swans players
North Launceston Football Club players
North Launceston Football Club coaches
Norm Smith Medal winners
1962 births
One-time VFL/AFL Premiership players